The 2021 World Seniors Championship (also referred to as the 2021 ROKiT World Seniors Snooker Championship for sponsorship purposes) was an invitational senior snooker tournament that was played from 6 to 9 May 2021 at the Crucible Theatre in Sheffield, England. The event was the 12th edition of the World Seniors Championship, first held in 1991. It was broadcast in the UK via the BBC's digital platforms and on the Red Button, on Zhibo TV, Superstar Online, Migu and Huya in China and on the matchroom.live streaming platform everywhere else.

COVID-19 travel restrictions meant that three of the players originally invited, 1980 World Champion Cliff Thorburn, Maltese player Tony Drago, and Pan American champion Bob Chaperon, were unable to take up their places. 1977 UK Champion Patsy Fagan, former world number 2 Tony Knowles and current WSF Seniors champion Igor Figueiredo were chosen to replace them.

Jimmy White was the defending champion, having won the 2020 edition with a 5–4 victory against Ken Doherty in the final. White reached the final for the third year in a row, but lost 5–3 to David Lilley, who won the title for the first time.

Main draw 
The results for the main draw are shown below. Numbers given in brackets are the players' seedings. Match winners are denoted in bold.

Final

Century breaks
Total: 4

134, 112  Darren Morgan
102  Ken Doherty
100  Igor Figueiredo

References 

2021
World Seniors Tour
2021 in snooker
2021 in English sport
May 2021 sports events in the United Kingdom
Sports competitions in Sheffield